Reservoir Hole is a cave in Cheddar Gorge in Somerset, southwest England. It contains what is believed to be the largest chamber yet found under the Mendip Hills.

The cave was first dug out in 1951 by members of Wessex Cave Club, and further progress was made in 1965 when "Moonmilk Chamber" was reached with the use of blasting. "Grand Gallery" was discovered in 1969, "Topless Aven" in 1970 and "Golgotha Rift" in 1973.

The possibility of a connection between Reservoir Hole and Gough's Cave, one of the show caves in Cheddar Gorge, has been raised, as the two caves are in close proximity. The stream in Reservoir Hole emerges only a short distance down Cheddar Gorge.

See also 
 Caves of the Mendip Hills

References

External links 
  (not yet updated for the newly discovered chamber)
 Geograph: photographs of parts of the cave known prior to 2012 discovery

Caves of the Mendip Hills
Limestone caves
Cheddar, Somerset